The Hyde is a locality in the London Borough of Barnet in London, England, and is also the name of its accompanying main road on the A5. It is located to the east of Kingsbury, west of Hendon and south of Colindale. The area contains Hyde House (a large building partly used as a hotel), Hendon Magistrates' Court, a large Sainsbury's supermarket, Silkbridge Retail Park, and BT Colindale House telephone exchange. The area is considered a part of Colindale.

History

The Hendon Brewery was built here in 1855.

The Hyde was home to the offices of Airco (until the company's closure in 1920), and also to the Head Office of furniture retailer MFI between 1989 and 2006, the greater part of that company's existence.

Colindale Telephone Exchange was built in the 1960s by British Telecom. Business activity at the site has decreased dramatically. In 2017 Barnet Council backed a regeneration scheme for new housing and converting the office units to residential ones.

A public house called Red Lion was at the corner of the A5 and Kingsbury Road. It closed in 2005 and the building demolished in 2009.

New apartments have been built in 2017 at the site of a former Homebase store and used car dealership, on the eastern side of the A5.

In 2020, plans were approved by Barnet Council to demolish the existing Hendon Sainsbury's supermarket on The Hyde and replaced with a new Sainsbury's along with 1,309 homes, despite strong opposition.

Geography
It is located at grid ref . It is part of the NW postcode area. A short section of the A5 road in the area is also called The Hyde.

References

Districts of the London Borough of Barnet
Areas of London
Places formerly in Middlesex
District centres of London